Aemene maculata is a moth of the family Erebidae. It was described by Gustave Arthur Poujade in 1886. It is found in western China and Taiwan.

References

Cisthenina
Moths described in 1886
Moths of Asia